A rapid reaction force is a military or police unit designed to respond in very short time frames to emergencies. When used in reference to police forces such as police tactical units, the time frame is minutes, while in military applications, such as with the use of paratroops or other commandos, the time frame is hours to days.

Rapid reaction forces are designed to intervene quickly as a spearhead to gain and hold ground in quickly unfolding combat or in rather low-intensity conflicts, such as uprisings that necessitate the evacuation of foreign embassies. Because they are usually transported by air, such military units are usually lightly armed, but often extremely well trained to compensate for their limited to small arms and light crew-served weapons and the lack of vehicles, armor and heavy equipment like tanks.

See also
 Eurofor
 European Gendarmerie Force
 European Union Battlegroups
 Allied Rapid Reaction Corps
 Immediate Response Force
 United States Rapid Deployment Forces
 Helsinki Headline Goal/Headline Force Catalogue—sometimes known incorrectly as the "European Rapid Reaction Force"
 Quick reaction force
 Contingency plan

Law enforcement units
Military units and formations by type